Hypolimnas anomala, the Malayan eggfly or crow eggfly is a species of eggfly.

Subspecies
Subspecies include:
Hypolimnas anomala anomala (southern Thailand, Peninsular Malaya, Singapore, Sumatra, Java, Borneo, Palawan, Philippines, Bali, Lombok, Enggano, Bawean)
Hypolimnas anomala arnoldi Fruhstorfer, 1903 (Kangean, Sumbawa, Flores)
Hypolimnas anomala discandra Weymer, 1885 (Nias)
Hypolimnas anomala euvaristos Fruhstorfer, 1912 (Philippines: Mindanao)
Hypolimnas anomala interstincta (Butler, 1873) (Borneo)
Hypolimnas anomala stellata (Fruhstorfer, 1912) (Sulawesi, Buton, Kabaena, Bangai, Sula)
Hypolimnas anomala sumbawana Pagenstecher, 1898 (Sumbawa)
Hypolimnas anomala truentus Fruhstorfer, 1912 (Philippines: Luzon and possibly Babuyanes)
Hypolimnas anomala wallaceana (Butler, 1873) (Sulawesi)

Distribution and habitat
This species is present as various subspecies in South East Asia (Moluccas, New Guinea, Australia). It especially occurs in lowlands and tropical rainforests, wastelands, hill parks and natural reserves.

Description

These butterflies have brown forewings with a purple sheen. They show variable white markings. Usually there are a double row of white marginal spots and three pale streaks on each forewings. The hindwings are rather paler, with dark brown veins. The undersides of both wings are similar to the uppersides. In the adult butterflies only four legs are present. These butterflies mimic Euploea species.

Biology
Females lay golden in colour globular eggs in a large cluster on the underside of the leaves. They hatch after about 3–4 days. The 6th (and final) instarcaterpillars are black with yellow spots and spines. Also the head is yellow. with long black cephalic horns. They are gregarious and usually occur in large numbers.

They feed  on leaves of  Urticaceae (Pipturus argenteus, Pipturus arboresceus, Pouzolzia, Villebrunea species ) and Euphorbiaceae (Claoxylon).

External links
 Tree of Life

Bibliography
Corbet AS, Pendlebury HM, and Eliot JN. 1992. The butterflies of the Malay Peninsula. Malayan Nature Society, Kuala Lumpur.
Parsons M. 1999. The butterflies of Papua New Guinea: their systematics and biology. Academic Press, San Diego.
Michael F. Braby, Butterflies of Australia, CSIRO Publishing, Melbourne 2000, vol. 2, pp. 566–567.

References

Butterflies described in 1869
anomala
Butterflies of Singapore
Butterflies of Borneo
Butterflies of Java
Taxa named by Alfred Russel Wallace